Hellfighters may mean:

 Harlem Hellfighters—the 369th Infantry Regiment (United States) during World War I
 Hellfighters (film)—the 1968 John Wayne movie based loosely on Red Adair